The Osseo Marching Band Festival is an annual street marching competition in Osseo, Minnesota, featuring some of the finest high school bands in the northern midwestern United States. The competition, which begins at noon, and the post-competition awards ceremony are free for the public to attend.

How it works
High school bands march through the city streets on a predetermined route (called a performance route) past a warm-up area, a judging area, a television area and then the finale area. After all of the bands have performed, an awards ceremony is held in the Osseo High School Stadium. A trophy and prize money is awarded to each of the first three places in each competition class. Trophies are also awarded to the best overall colorguard, drumline, winds and the grand champion. 

High school marching bands apply to compete each year. There is no cost to the bands and typically each band is provided with a travel stipend to help offset the cost of transportation.

History
The Osseo Marching Band Festival was created by the Osseo Band Boosters as a community event - to allow the local students of Independent School District 279 a place to perform in front of their hometown crowd and compete with other area bands. ISD 279 has three high schools within the district, Osseo Senior High School, Maple Grove Senior High School and Park Center Senior High School. All have a strong music department and a large marching band. 

The first annual Osseo Marching Band Festival was held on June 24, 2007. Performances were by the 12 competing high school bands, the Osseo High School Marching Band (host band), the Osseo High School Alumni Band, and the 451st Army Band as the Honor Band. The Crystal VFW provided the color guard for the event.

Schedule
The Osseo Marching Band Festival is held at noon on Saturday of the last full weekend of June, which is typically the day before the Vikingland Band Festival in Alexandria, Minnesota. Upcoming dates for the Osseo Marching Band Festival include: 
 June 28, 2008
 June 27, 2009
 June 26, 2010
 June 25, 2011
 June 23, 2012
 June 22, 2013

External links
Osseo Marching Band Festival Official Site
City of Osseo Official Site

Music education in the United States
Tourist attractions in Hennepin County, Minnesota
Music festivals in Minnesota